Ar Re Yaouank is a Breton band, established in 1986 by two brothers born in Quimper, Brittany, northwestern France, Fred and Jean-Charles Guichen (16 and 14 years at that time) playing the diatonic accordion and the acoustic guitar respectively. They were joined in 1987 by Gaël Nicol (bombard and bagpipes), David Pasquet (bombards), then in 1990 by Stéphane De Vito playing the electric bass.

With the energy of the rock, while respecting the spirit of the traditional tunes, they add a very fast rhythm, bringing dancers in the trance. Thus, they revitalized the Fest Noz (night festival), attracting the young audience and new followers. The group disbanded in 1998, and each continued to evolve in the Breton music, with various bands. The Brothers Guichen mainly worked as a duo under their own name.

History

Reformation 
On July 14, 2011, the group agreed to re-form exceptionally and to open the 20th edition of the Vieilles Charrues Festival, on the main stage, in front of 40,000 spectators, dancing the an dro and gavottes. During a private party for the meal of the volunteers of the Vieilles Charrues Festival in January, 2012, the band played together a second time. It also re-formed a third time on November 23, 2013 during the Yaouank Festival in front of more than 8,000 dancers

Discography

Studio albums and live 
1989: Sidwel
1992: Fest-Noz Still Alive
1994: Breizh Positive
1996: Trivet Act (Act 3)

Participations
1995 : Kleg Live

Compilations
1998: Best of
2013: L'intégrale ("The Complete", 4 CDs Coop Breizh)

References

External links
 Ar Re Yaouank on discogs.com
 Video Live in Francofolies Festival, "Breizh positive"

French world music groups
French rock music groups
Musical groups established in 1986
Breton musical groups
1986 establishments in France